Ashvale is a village in Blaenau Gwent, south Wales (within the historic boundaries of Monmouthshire).

Villages in Blaenau Gwent